Paço de São Cristóvão (also known as Palácio Imperial or Palácio Imperial de São Cristóvão) was an imperial palace located in the Quinta da Boa Vista park in the Imperial Neighbourhood of São Cristóvão, Rio de Janeiro, Brazil. It served as residence to the Portuguese Royal Family and later to the Brazilian Imperial Family until 1889, when the country became a republic through a coup d'état deposing Emperor Pedro II. The palace briefly served as a public building by the provisional government for the constituent assembly of the first republican constitution. It housed the major part (92.5%) of the collections of the National Museum of Brazil, which, together with the building, were largely destroyed by a fire on 2 September 2018.

History

Background

In the 16th and 17th centuries, the area where the Palace is currently located, was part of a Jesuit farm in the outskirts of Rio de Janeiro. With the expulsion of the Order in 1759, the property was dismembered and passed into private ownership.
In the early 19th century, the area known as Quinta da Boa Vista (Good View Estate), because could be seen from there the Tijuca Forest, the Corcovado Hill and the Cajú Beach, belonged to the Portuguese-Lebanese slave merchant, Elie Antun Lubbus, (Elias Antônio Lopes in Portuguese language), who had erected, around 1803, a manor house on top of a hill, from which one had a good view of the Guanabara Bay – which gave rise to the current name of region. When the Portuguese court was transferred to Brazil, in 1808, Elias António Lopes donated his farm to the prince regent John VI. John VI appreciated the gift and stayed for long periods in the manor house. Before belonging to the monarchy, the residence had nothing special. It was just one of many colonial-style mansions scattered throughout the country. With the arrival of John VI to Brazil, who had left Lisbon fleeing Napoleon in 1808, countless houses in Rio were expropriated to house the Portuguese of the royal entourage. Before his Quinta da Boa Vista was confiscated, the merchant Elias Antônio Lopes hastened to donate it to the king. In thanks for his mime, João VI granted Lopes titles of nobility and a fat indemnity. The mansion underwent countless renovations over the decades. An imposing masonry and cast iron gate was set there. It was built a side tower in Moorish style. There was a semicircular staircase to enter the residence on the second floor. Later, another tower rose, at the opposite end, in neoclassical style. The ladder was destroyed, and the entrance turned to the first floor. The third floor was built. The Moorish tower was rebuilt, which became also neoclassical. The purpose of the changes was to leave the Palace of São Cristóvão to the height of the power of the Brazilian Empire. In 1847, Parliament approved a government bill that would allocate 240 contos de reis to the completion of the reforms. The works seemed to have no end. For Senator Clemente Pereira (PA), Pedro II had to leave Sao Cristóvão, Pereira's proposal was approved, but the government did not even design a new imperial palace.

Royal residence

Prince Regent John and his family had been living in the Paço Imperial since their arrival in Rio de Janeiro in 1808. The prince regent felt very honored by Elias's gift of the best house in Rio and rewarded Elias with another property, not quite as grand. He began transforming the manor into a royal residence. At the time, the area of the farm was still surrounded by mangroves and communication by land with the city was difficult. Later, the wetlands were drained and the roads improved.

To better accommodate the royal family, the manor house, though vast and comfortable, needed to be adapted. The most important renovation was begun at the time of the nuptials of Prince Pedro with the Archduchess Maria Leopoldina of Austria, in 1819, and finished 1821. The renovation was directed by English architect John Johnston. In front of the palace, Johnston installed a decorative portico, a gift sent from England to Brazil by Hugh Percy, 2nd Duke of Northumberland. The gate, inspired by Robert Adams' porch for the "Sion House", the nobleman's residence in England, is shaped in "Coade stone" manufactured by the English company Coade & Sealy.

The architectural line of the palace is similar to that of the Ajuda Palace which, left behind in Lisbon, was never finished. The Palace of São Cristóvão won deserved prominence as the new state palace of the United Kingdom of Portugal, Brazil and the Algarves and, subsequently, of the Portuguese Empire.

Imperial residence

After the declaration of Independence of Brazil in 1822, the palace became the residence of Emperor Pedro I. The remodelling and expansion of the palace continued under Portuguese architect Manuel da Costa (1822–1826), followed by French architect Pedro José Pezerát (1826–1831), credited as the author of the definitive Neoclassical project of the building. He added a new tower to the left of the main façade and added a third floor to the palace. The works were continued after 1847 by Brazilian artist Manuel de Araújo Porto-alegre, who harmonised the style of the façades, followed by the German Theodore Marx (1857–1868). Italian painter Mario Bragaldi decorated many of the rooms of the palace, including the Throne Room and the Ambassadors' Room, with paintings in trompe-l'œil.

After the marriage of Pedro I and Archduchess Maria Leopoldina of Austria in 1817, the Imperial couple resided in the palace. The future Queen of Portugal, Maria II, and the future Emperor of Brazil Pedro II were born here. Empress Maria Leopoldina died in the palace in 1826. Pedro II, future Emperor, grew up and was educated in the palace, and in 1869 ordered the remodelling of the gardens. French garden designer Auguste François Marie Glaziou was put in charge of the project, which included artificial lakes, bridges, caves and fake ancient temples, all following the Romantic trend of the time. Pedro II's children were also born in the palace, including Princess Isabel, famous for having abolished slavery from Brazil in 1888. After the Proclamation of the Republic in 1889, the Imperial family left the country and the palace and its surrounding gardens became empty.

Republican period

In 1891, the building was used by Brazilian politicians writing the first Republican Constitution of the country.

In 1892, the director of the National Museum of Rio de Janeiro managed to transfer the institution from the Campo de Santana to the palace. The inner decoration of the palace was dispersed, but part of it can still be found in other museums, like the Imperial Museum of Petrópolis, in which the Throne Room was reassembled.

National Museum

Founded in 1818 by King John VI of Portugal, the National Museum was transferred to the old Imperial Palace of São Cristóvão in 1892. During its long history, its collections have been greatly expanded by acquisitions and donations, including by Emperor Pedro II, a great sponsor of the sciences. The collections included Astronomy (mostly meteorites), Palaeontology, Natural history, Ethnology (including many interesting works by Brazilian indigenous peoples) and Archaeology (mostly antiquities from ancient Egypt).

Much of the art collection displayed by the Museum still consisted of what was gathered by the Emperor Pedro II himself. In this manner, it reflects 19th-century views of Anthropology, Archeology and sciences in general.

Visitors could also see a few rooms of the ancient Palace with its original painted and stucco decoration, like the Throne Room, the Ambassadors' Room and the room of Empress Teresa Cristina. These rooms still displayed a couple original pieces but were overall empty.

On 2 September 2018, the palace was devastated by an extensive fire. The damage to heritage assets have been reported to be "incalculable". One of the few known surviving major artifacts is the Bendegó meteorite. After the fire, a metallic roof covering 5,000 m2 upper the debris was built.

Gallery

Historic timeline of construction

Exterior before the 2018 fire

Interior before the 2018 fire

Grounds

Investigations 
The fire that destroyed the National Museum began in the air-conditioning equipment of auditorium on the ground floor. One of the three devices did not have external grounding, there was no individual circuit breaker for each of them and a wire was without insulation in contact with metal.

See also
Paço Imperial, the seat of the Imperial government
Quinta da Boa Vista
National Museum of Brazil

References

Quinta da Boa Vista e Paço de São Cristóvão Rio de Janeiro Aqui. Retrieved on 2009-07-04.

External links

National Museum of Brazil official website 

Neoclassical architecture in Brazil
Palaces in Rio de Janeiro (city)
Houses completed in 1862
Sao Cristovao, Paco de
National Museum of Brazil
Burned buildings and structures in Brazil
Collapsed buildings and structures
Building collapses in 2018